= Liangyou Group =

Chinese food company

- Trade name: Shanghai Liangyou Group Company
- Native name: 上海良友集团有限公司
- Company type: State-owned company
- Industry: Food industry
- Founded: 1998; 27 years ago
- Headquarters: Shanghai, China
- Area served: China
- Products: Lehui rice, Haishi refined oil, Seagull condiment, Xuege flour and Weidu noodles
- Owner: Chinese state
- Divisions: 20
- Website: www.shliangyou.com

Liangyou Group, also known as Shanghai Liangyou Group Company (Chinese: 上海良友集团有限公司), is a Chinese state-owned food company based in Shanghai which is the sixth largest food company in China. Founded in 1998, it has more than 20 subsidiaries or affiliates.

Its business is mainly in the field of food and oil storage, wholesale and processing, domestic and foreign bulk trade, import and export, chain sales, assets management and entity investment. Five of its brands are officially recognized as famous brands of Shanghai: Lehui rice, Haishi refined oil, Seagull condiment, Xuege flour and Weidu noodles.

As of 2015, Liangyou Group was the 275th largest industrial company in China, with a revenue of 22.4 billion yuan.
